Nannopsittaca is a genus of parrot in the family Psittacidae.

Species
It contains the following species:

External links

 
Psittacidae
Bird genera
Taxa named by Robert Ridgway
Taxonomy articles created by Polbot